The 1902–03 Brown men's ice hockey season was the 6th season of play for the program.

Season
Brown followed a poor 1902 season with an even worse performance. The Brunos won a single game, against a local high school, and in their five other contests they could only muster 2 goals, finishing the season dead least in intercollegiate play.

Roster

Standings

Schedule and Results

|-
!colspan=12 style=";" | Regular Season

References

Brown Bears men's ice hockey seasons
Brown
Brown
Brown
Brown